Sky Travel was first launched on 3 October 1994 (and later in 2003 relaunched as Sky Travel Shop) and showed extensive programmes about travel, adverts for travel agencies, and documentaries, with Sky Travel Shop being the adverts for travel agencies. Sky Travel Shop relaunched as Sky Travel when Sky Real Lives launched. In 2009, Sky Travel changed its logo slightly. The channel closed on 24 June 2010.

Closure
On 24 May 2010, British Sky Broadcasting announced that they would close Sky Travel and the associated website on 24 June due to intense competition from the internet. A Sky spokesman said, "It was a difficult decision as the team has delivered a great product but the internet, rather than linear TV, has become the main channel for holiday retailing. In a competitive market, we will continue to focus on our core strategy of doing fewer things but better." Sky Travel closed at 11pm on 24 June 2010.

See also
Blue Monday

References

External links
Sky Travel at sky.com (archived)
Sky Travel at TV Ark

Sky television channels
Television channels and stations established in 2003
Television channels and stations disestablished in 2010
Defunct television channels in the United Kingdom
Travel television